Robert Power may refer to:

 Robert Power (cricketer) (1833–1914), Australian cricketer
 Robert Power (Australian cyclist) (born 1995), Australian cyclist
 Robert Power (Irish cyclist) (born 1971), Irish cyclist
 Robert Power (surveyor) (1794–1869), Surveyor General of Tasmania
 Robbie Power, Irish jockey

See also
 Robert Powers (disambiguation)
 Bob Power
 Robert Bower (disambiguation)